Ussara semicoronis is a moth in the family Glyphipterigidae. It is known from Ethiopia.

References

Endemic fauna of Ethiopia
Glyphipterigidae
Insects of Ethiopia
Moths of Africa
Moths described in 1932